Ungureni is a commune in Bacău County, Western Moldavia, Romania. It is composed of eight villages: Bărtășești, Bibirești, Bota, Botești, Gârla Anei, Ungureni, Viforeni and Zlătari.

Natives
 Radu Lecca

References

Communes in Bacău County
Localities in Western Moldavia